Tilia dasystyla is a deciduous lime tree species. It contains the following subspecies:

T. dasystyla subsp. caucasica (V.Engl.) Pigott (syn. T. begoniifolia, T. caucasica, T. platyphyllos subsp. caucasica, T. rubra var. begoniifolia, T. rubra subsp. caucasica) – northern Iran, northern and western Turkey, Caucasus, and Crimea
T. dasystyla subsp. dasystyla – Crimea

References

dasystyla
Flora of Armenia
Trees of Azerbaijan
Trees of Georgia (country)
Trees of Western Asia
Trees of Russia
Trees of Turkey
Flora of the Crimean Peninsula
Plants described in 1832
Garden plants of Asia
Garden plants of Europe
Ornamental trees